Percy Walker (1812-1880) was an American politician from Huntsville, Alabama.

He was graduated from the medical department of the University of Pennsylvania at Philadelphia in 1835. He began practicing medicine in Mobile, Alabama. He served in the campaign against the Creek Indians. He studied law and was admitted to the bar. He practiced law in Mobile. He served as State's Attorney for the 6th judicial district.

He was elected to the State House of Representatives in 1839, 1847, and 1853, elected as a candidate of the American Party to the Thirty-fourth Congress (4 March 1855 – 3 March 1857). He declined to be a candidate for renomination in 1856.

He died in Mobile on 31 December 1880, and was interred in Magnolia Cemetery.

Sources

1812 births
1880 deaths
Politicians from Huntsville, Alabama
Members of the United States House of Representatives from Alabama
Know-Nothing members of the United States House of Representatives from Alabama
Perelman School of Medicine at the University of Pennsylvania alumni
19th-century American politicians
Walker family
Lawyers from Huntsville, Alabama
19th-century American lawyers